By-elections to the 7th Canadian Parliament were held to elect members of the House of Commons of Canada between the 1891 federal election and the 1896 federal election. The Conservative Party of Canada led a majority government for the 7th Canadian Parliament.

The list includes Ministerial by-elections which occurred due to the requirement that Members of Parliament recontest their seats upon being appointed to Cabinet. These by-elections were almost always uncontested. This requirement was abolished in 1931.

See also
List of federal by-elections in Canada

Sources
 Parliament of Canada–Elected in By-Elections 

1896 elections in Canada
1895 elections in Canada
1894 elections in Canada
1893 elections in Canada
1892 elections in Canada
1891 elections in Canada
07th